Oxycephalidae is a family of crustaceans belonging to the order Amphipoda.

Genera

Genera:
 Calamorhynchus Streets, 1878
 Cranocephalus Bovallius, 1890

References

Amphipoda